Parade of the Vanquished also known as The Defeat Parade was a march of German prisoners of war during July 1944 in Moscow. The parade was a result of the ongoing Operation Bagration during World War II. Large numbers of German troops were held captive by the Soviets, and the operation was considered a turning point in war and represented the largest losses of German troops. Approximately 57,000 captured troops were chosen, organized and paraded in Moscow. These men were among the most healthy to make the march as close to half of the total losses for Germany during the operation came from 160,000 troops dying on the march to prison camps. The parade was used by Soviet Union leader Joseph Stalin to demonstrate the success of the operation.

References

Prisoners of war held by the Soviet Union
July 1944 events
Operation Bagration
1944 in Moscow